Ischnopsis is a genus of moths, belonging to the family Coleophoridae containing only one species, Ischnopsis angustella, which is known from South Africa.

References

Endemic moths of South Africa
Coleophoridae
Moths of Africa
Monotypic moth genera